is a passenger railway station in located in the city of Yokkaichi,  Mie Prefecture, Japan, operated by the private railway operator Kintetsu Railway.

Lines
Kusu Station is served by the Nagoya Line, and is located 44.2 rail kilometers from the starting point of the line at Kintetsu Nagoya Station.

Station layout
The station consists of two opposed side platforms, connected by an underground passage. There are two pass-only tracks between the two platforms.

Platforms

Adjacent stations

History
Kusu Station opened on December 22, 1917 as a station on the Ise Railway. The Ise Railway became the Sangu Express Electric Railway’s Ise Line on September 15, 1936, and was renamed the Nagoya Line on December 7, 1938. After merging with Osaka Electric Kido on March 15, 1941, the line became the Kansai Express Railway's Nagoya Line. This line was merged with the Nankai Electric Railway on June 1, 1944 to form Kintetsu.

Passenger statistics
In fiscal 2019, the station was used by an average of 913 passengers daily (boarding passengers only).

Surrounding area
Takara Holdings
Kusu Post Office
 Kusu fishing port

See also
List of railway stations in Japan

References

External links

 Kintetsu: Kusu Station 

Railway stations in Japan opened in 1917
Railway stations in Mie Prefecture
Stations of Kintetsu Railway
Yokkaichi